Strobilanthes is a genus of about 350 species of flowering plants in the family Acanthaceae, mostly native to tropical Asia and Madagascar, but with a few species extending north into temperate regions of Asia. Many species are cultivated for their two-lipped, hooded flowers in shades of blue, pink, white and purple. Most are frost-tender and require protection in frost-prone areas.

Species

Strobilanthes atropurpurea is a temperate species, native to eastern Siberia; it is cultivated for its purple flowers.

Strobilanthes dyeriana (Persian shield) is a tropical plant native to Myanmar. It is grown for its dark green foliage with bright, metallic-purple stripes radiating outward from the central leaf vein. In proper conditions, it will also produce pale purple flowers. Persian Shield grows best outdoors in USDA zones 9 and 10, although it can survive in other zones as a houseplant given sufficient temperature, soil moisture and humidity. It has gained the Royal Horticultural Society's Award of Garden Merit.

Plants of the World Online currently includes:

 Strobilanthes abbreviata Y.F.Deng & J.R.I.Wood
 Strobilanthes accrescens J.R.I.Wood
 Strobilanthes adenophora Nees
 Strobilanthes adnata C.B.Clarke
 Strobilanthes adpressa J.R.I.Wood
 Strobilanthes afriastiniae J.R.Benn.
 Strobilanthes alata Blume
 Strobilanthes albostriata Ridl.
 Strobilanthes alboviridis J.B.Imlay
 Strobilanthes alternata (Burm.f.) Moylan ex J.R.I.Wood
 Strobilanthes amabilis C.B.Clarke
 Strobilanthes anamallaica J.R.I.Wood
 Strobilanthes anamitica Kuntze
 Strobilanthes anceps Nees
 Strobilanthes andamanensis Bor
 Strobilanthes andersonii Bedd.
 Strobilanthes angustifrons C.B.Clarke
 Strobilanthes anisophylla (Wall. ex Hook.) T.Anderson
 Strobilanthes antonii Elmer
 Strobilanthes apoensis (Elmer) Merr.
 Strobilanthes aprica (Hance) T.Anderson ex Benth.
 Strobilanthes arborea Span.
 Strobilanthes arenicola W.W.Sm.
 Strobilanthes argentea J.B.Imlay
 Strobilanthes arnottiana Nees
 Strobilanthes articulata J.B.Imlay
 Strobilanthes assimulata S.Moore
 Strobilanthes asymmetrica J.R.I.Wood & J.R.Benn.
 Strobilanthes atropurpurea Nees
 Strobilanthes atroviridis Y.F.Deng & J.R.I.Wood
 Strobilanthes attenuata (Wall. ex Nees) Jacq. ex Nees
 Strobilanthes auriculata Nees
  S. auriculata var. dyeriana (Mast.) J.R.I.Wood = Strobilanthes dyeriana
 Strobilanthes aurita J.R.I.Wood
 Strobilanthes austrosinensis Y.F.Deng & J.R.I.Wood
 Strobilanthes autapomorpha J.R.Benn.
 Strobilanthes axilliflora C.B.Clarke ex S.Moore
 Strobilanthes backeri (Bremek.) J.R.Benn.
 Strobilanthes bakeri (Merr.) Y.F.Deng
 Strobilanthes bantonensis Lindau
 Strobilanthes baracatanensis (Elmer) Y.F.Deng
 Strobilanthes barbata Nees
 Strobilanthes barbigera J.R.I.Wood, Nuraliev & Scotland
 Strobilanthes barisanensis (Bremek.) J.R.I.Wood
 Strobilanthes bheriensis (Shakya) J.R.I.Wood
 Strobilanthes bibracteata Blume
 Strobilanthes bilabiata J.R.I.Wood
 Strobilanthes biocullata Y.F.Deng & J.R.I.Wood
 Strobilanthes bipartita Terao ex J.R.I.Wood
 Strobilanthes birmanica (Bremek.) W.J.Kress & DeFilipps
 Strobilanthes bislei Sinj.Thomas, B.Mani, Britto & Pradeep
 Strobilanthes blumeana (Nees) Y.F.Deng
 Strobilanthes bogoriensis Lindau
 Strobilanthes bolumpattiana Bedd.
 Strobilanthes bombycina J.B.Imlay
 Strobilanthes borii J.R.I.Wood
 Strobilanthes bracteata (Nees) J.R.I.Wood
 Strobilanthes brandisii T.Anderson
 Strobilanthes bremekampiana J.R.I.Wood & J.R.Benn.
 Strobilanthes brunelloides (Lam.) J.R.I.Wood
 Strobilanthes brunnescens Benoist
 Strobilanthes brunoniana Nees
 Strobilanthes bulusanensis Elmer
 Strobilanthes bunnemeyeri J.R.I.Wood
 Strobilanthes calcicola J.R.I.Wood & J.R.Benn.
 Strobilanthes callosa Nees
 Strobilanthes calvata J.R.I.Wood
 Strobilanthes calycina Nees
 Strobilanthes campaniformis J.R.I.Wood
 Strobilanthes campanulata Wight
 Strobilanthes canarica Bedd.
 Strobilanthes candida J.R.I.Wood
 Strobilanthes capillipes C.B.Clarke ex Ridl.
 Strobilanthes capitata (Nees) T.Anderson
 Strobilanthes carinei J.R.I.Wood
 Strobilanthes carnatica Carine, J.M.Alexander & Scotland
 Strobilanthes caudata T.Anderson
 Strobilanthes celebica (Bremek.) J.R.I.Wood
 Strobilanthes cernua Blume
 Strobilanthes chiangdaoensis Terao
 Strobilanthes chinensis (Nees) J.R.I.Wood & Y.F.Deng
 Strobilanthes chrysodelta J.R.I.Wood
 Strobilanthes ciliata Nees
 Strobilanthes cincinnalis C.B.Clarke
 Strobilanthes clarkei J.R.I.Wood
 Strobilanthes coertii Terao ex J.R.Benn.
 Strobilanthes cognata Benoist
 Strobilanthes collina Nees
 Strobilanthes compacta D.Fang & H.S.Lo
 Strobilanthes congesta Terao
 Strobilanthes connata Collett & Hemsl.
 Strobilanthes consanguinea (Nees) T.Anderson
 Strobilanthes cordifolia (Vahl) J.R.I.Wood
 Strobilanthes corrugata J.B.Imlay
 Strobilanthes crassifolia Miq.
 Strobilanthes crataegifolia T.Anderson
 Strobilanthes crispa (L.) Blume
 Strobilanthes crossandra (Steud.) J.R.I.Wood
 Strobilanthes cruciata (Bremek.) Terao
 Strobilanthes cumingiana (Nees) Y.F.Deng & J.R.I.Wood
 Strobilanthes cuneata (Shakya) J.R.I.Wood
 Strobilanthes cusia (Nees) Kuntze
 Strobilanthes cuspidata (Benth.) T.Anderson
 Strobilanthes cycla C.B.Clarke ex W.W.Sm.
 Strobilanthes cyphantha Diels
 Strobilanthes cystolithigera Lindau
 Strobilanthes dalzielii (W.W.Sm.) Benoist
 Strobilanthes decipiens J.R.I.Wood
 Strobilanthes decumbens (Bremek.) J.R.I.Wood
 Strobilanthes decurrens Nees
 Strobilanthes deflexa T.Anderson
 Strobilanthes densa Benoist
 Strobilanthes denticulata (Nees) T.Anderson
 Strobilanthes diandra (Nees) Alston
 Strobilanthes dimorphotricha Hance
 Strobilanthes discolor T.Anderson
 Strobilanthes disparifolia J.R.I.Wood
 Strobilanthes divaricata (Nees) T.Anderson
 Strobilanthes dolichophylla Benoist
 Strobilanthes dryadum Benoist
 Strobilanthes dupenii Bedd. ex C.B.Clarke
 Strobilanthes echinata Nees
 Strobilanthes elmeri Y.F.Deng
 Strobilanthes elongata C.B.Clarke
 Strobilanthes erecta C.B.Clarke
 Strobilanthes esquirolii H.Lév.
 Strobilanthes euantha J.R.I.Wood
 Strobilanthes exserta C.B.Clarke
 Strobilanthes extensa (Nees) Nees
 Strobilanthes falconeri T.Anderson
 Strobilanthes farinosa C.B.Clarke
 Strobilanthes fengiana Y.F.Deng & J.R.I.Wood
 Strobilanthes ferruginea D.Fang & H.S.Lo
 Strobilanthes filiformis Blume
 Strobilanthes fimbriata Nees
 Strobilanthes flava Kurz
 Strobilanthes flexa Benoist
 Strobilanthes flexicaulis Hayata
 Strobilanthes fluviatilis (C.B.Clarke ex W.W.Sm.) Moylan & Y.F.Deng
 Strobilanthes foliosa (Wight) T.Anderson
 Strobilanthes formosana S.Moore
 Strobilanthes forrestii Diels
 Strobilanthes fragrans J.R.I.Wood
 Strobilanthes frondosa J.R.I.Wood
 Strobilanthes fruticosa (Chatterjee) W.J.Kress & DeFilipps
 Strobilanthes fruticulosa (C.B.Clarke) Y.F.Deng
 Strobilanthes fusca J.R.I.Wood
 Strobilanthes galeopsis Stapf
 Strobilanthes gamblei Carine, J.M.Alexander & Scotland
 Strobilanthes gardneriana (Nees) T.Anderson
 Strobilanthes gigantodes Lindau
 Strobilanthes glabrata Nees
 Strobilanthes glandibracteata D.Fang & H.S.Lo
 Strobilanthes glandulosa Blume
 Strobilanthes glaucescens Nees
 Strobilanthes glomerata (Nees) T.Anderson
 Strobilanthes glutinosa Nees
 Strobilanthes gossypina T.Anderson
 Strobilanthes gracilis Bedd.
 Strobilanthes graminea J.B.Imlay
 Strobilanthes gregalis Collett & Hemsl.
 Strobilanthes guangxiensis S.Z.Huang
 Strobilanthes habracanthoides J.R.I.Wood
 Strobilanthes halconensis Merr.
 Strobilanthes hallbergii Blatt.
 Strobilanthes hamiltoniana (Steud.) Bosser & Heine
 Strobilanthes helferi T.Anderson
 Strobilanthes helicoides T.Anderson
 Strobilanthes helicta T.Anderson
 Strobilanthes heliophila J.R.I.Wood
 Strobilanthes henryi Hemsl.
 Strobilanthes heterochroa Hand.-Mazz.
 Strobilanthes heteroclita D.Fang & H.S.Lo
 Strobilanthes heteromalla T.Anderson ex C.B.Clarke
 Strobilanthes heyneana Nees
 Strobilanthes himalayana J.R.I.Wood
 Strobilanthes hirsuta Decne.
 Strobilanthes hirta (Vahl) Blume
 Strobilanthes hirticalyx Ridl.
 Strobilanthes hirtisepala C.B.Clarke
 Strobilanthes homotropa Nees
 Strobilanthes hongii Y.F.Deng & F.L.Chen
 Strobilanthes hookeri Nees
 Strobilanthes hossei C.B.Clarke
 Strobilanthes humilis (Nees) Gamble
 Strobilanthes hupehensis W.W.Sm.
 Strobilanthes hypericoides J.R.I.Wood
 Strobilanthes hypomalla Benoist
 Strobilanthes imbricata Nees
 Strobilanthes imlayae J.R.I.Wood
 Strobilanthes incisa J.B.Imlay
 Strobilanthes inflata T.Anderson
 Strobilanthes integrifolia (Dalzell) Kuntze 
 also Strobilanthes integrifolius
 Strobilanthes involucrata Blume
 Strobilanthes ixiocephala Benth.
 Strobilanthes japonica (Thunb.) Miq.
 Strobilanthes jennyae J.R.I.Wood
 Strobilanthes jeyporensis Bedd.
 Strobilanthes jogensis Gilli
 Strobilanthes jomyi P.Biju, Josekutty, Rekha & J.R.I.Wood
 Strobilanthes kachinensis J.R.I.Wood & J.R.Benn.
 Strobilanthes kannanii Josekutty, P.Biju, J.R.I.Wood & Augustine
 Strobilanthes karensium Kurz
 Strobilanthes khasyana T.Anderson
 Strobilanthes khoshooana (S.R.Paul) Karthik. & Moorthy
 Strobilanthes kingdonii J.R.I.Wood
 Strobilanthes kjellbergii J.R.I.Wood
 Strobilanthes klossii (S.Moore) Y.F.Deng
 Strobilanthes koordersii C.B.Clarke ex Koord.
 Strobilanthes korthalsii (Bremek.) J.R.I.Wood
 Strobilanthes kunthiana T.Anderson ex Benth.
 Strobilanthes labordei H.Lév.
 Strobilanthes lachenensis C.B.Clarke
 Strobilanthes lamiifolia (Nees) T.Anderson
 Strobilanthes lamioides T.Anderson
 Strobilanthes lamium C.B.Clarke ex W.W.Sm.
 Strobilanthes lanata Nees
 Strobilanthes lanceifolia T.Anderson
 Strobilanthes lanyuensis Seok, C.F.Hsieh & J.Murata
 Strobilanthes larium Hand.-Mazz.
 Strobilanthes latebrosa Ridl.
 Strobilanthes latibracteata J.B.Imlay
 Strobilanthes lawsonii Gamble
 Strobilanthes laxa T.Anderson
 Strobilanthes leucopogon Ridl.
 Strobilanthes lihengiae Y.F.Deng & J.R.I.Wood
 Strobilanthes linearifolia (Bremek.) Y.F.Deng
 Strobilanthes longespicata Hayata
 Strobilanthes longgangensis D.Fang & H.S.Lo
 Strobilanthes longiflora Benoist
 Strobilanthes longipedunculata Terao ex J.R.I.Wood
 Strobilanthes longipetiolata (Merr.) Y.F.Deng
 Strobilanthes longispica (H.P.Tsui) J.R.I.Wood & Y.F.Deng
 Strobilanthes longistaminea J.R.I.Wood
 Strobilanthes longzhouensis H.S.Lo & D.Fang
 Strobilanthes lupulina Nees
 Strobilanthes lurida Wight
 Strobilanthes maclellandii C.B.Clarke
 Strobilanthes maclurei Merr.
 Strobilanthes maculata (Wall.) Nees
 Strobilanthes maingayi C.B.Clarke
 Strobilanthes malabarica Josekutty, P.Biju & Augustine
 Strobilanthes mastersii T.Anderson
 Strobilanthes matthewiana Scotland
 Strobilanthes maxwellii J.R.I.Wood
 Strobilanthes mearnsii Merr.
 Strobilanthes medogensis (H.W.Li) J.R.I.Wood & Y.F.Deng
 Strobilanthes meeboldii Craib
 Strobilanthes mekongensis W.W.Sm.
 Strobilanthes membranacea Talbot
 Strobilanthes merrillii C.B.Clarke
 Strobilanthes micrantha Wight
 Strobilanthes microcarpa T.Anderson
 Strobilanthes microstachya Benth.
 Strobilanthes mogokensis Lace
 Strobilanthes monadelpha Nees
 Strobilanthes moschifera Blume
 Strobilanthes mucronatoproducta Lindau
 Strobilanthes mullayanagiriensis Sinj.Thomas, B.Mani, Britto & Pradeep
 Strobilanthes multangula Benoist
 Strobilanthes multidens C.B.Clarke
 Strobilanthes multiflora Ridl.
 Strobilanthes muratae J.R.I.Wood
 Strobilanthes murutorum J.R.I.Wood
 Strobilanthes myura Benoist
 Strobilanthes nagaensis (Bremek.) W.J.Kress & DeFilipps
 Strobilanthes namkadingensis Soulad. & Tagane
 Strobilanthes naumannii Engl.
 Strobilanthes neilgherrensis Bedd.
 Strobilanthes nemorosa Benoist
 Strobilanthes neoaspera Venu & P.Daniel
 Strobilanthes newii Bedd. ex C.B.Clarke
 Strobilanthes nigrescens T.Anderson
 Strobilanthes ningmingensis D.Fang & H.S.Lo
 Strobilanthes nobilis C.B.Clarke
 Strobilanthes nockii Trimen
 Strobilanthes novomegapolitana Lindau
 Strobilanthes nutans (Nees) T.Anderson
 Strobilanthes obesa Benoist
 Strobilanthes obtusibracteata Terao
 Strobilanthes oligantha Miq.
 Strobilanthes oligocephala T.Anderson ex C.B.Clarke
 Strobilanthes oresbia W.W.Sm.
 Strobilanthes orientalis J.R.I.Wood
 Strobilanthes orthostachya (Bremek.) J.R.I.Wood & J.R.Benn.
 Strobilanthes ovata Y.F.Deng & J.R.I.Wood
 Strobilanthes ovatibracteata H.S.Lo & D.Fang
 Strobilanthes ovatifolia (Bremek.) J.R.I.Wood
 Strobilanthes oxycalycina J.R.I.Wood
 Strobilanthes pachyphylla C.B.Clarke
 Strobilanthes pachys C.B.Clarke ex Merr.
 Strobilanthes palawanensis Elmer
 Strobilanthes panichanga (Nees) T.Anderson
 Strobilanthes paniculata (Nees) Miq.
 Strobilanthes paniculiformis J.R.I.Wood
 Strobilanthes papillosa T.Anderson
 Strobilanthes parabolica Nees
 Strobilanthes parryorum C.E.C.Fisch.
 Strobilanthes parvifolia J.R.I.Wood
 Strobilanthes pateriformis Lindau
 Strobilanthes patulus Benoist
 Strobilanthes pauciflora (Merr.) Y.F.Deng
 Strobilanthes pavala (Roxb.) J.R.I.Wood
 Strobilanthes pedicellata Ridl.
 Strobilanthes pedunculosa Miq.
 Strobilanthes pendula J.R.I.Wood & J.R.Benn.
 Strobilanthes peninsularis Terao
 Strobilanthes pentandra J.R.I.Wood
 Strobilanthes pentastemonoides (Nees) T.Anderson 
 also Strobilanthes penstemonoides
 Strobilanthes perplexa J.R.I.Wood
 Strobilanthes perrottetiana Nees
 Strobilanthes phoenicea Ridl.
 Strobilanthes phyllocephala J.R.I.Wood & Scotland
 Strobilanthes phyllostachya Kurz
 Strobilanthes pinetorum W.W.Sm.
 Strobilanthes pluriformis C.B.Clarke
 Strobilanthes poilanei Benoist
 Strobilanthes polybotrya Miq.
 Strobilanthes polyneuros C.B.Clarke ex W.W.Sm.
 Strobilanthes polystachya Benoist
 Strobilanthes polythrix T.Anderson
 Strobilanthes pothigaiensis Gopalan & Chithra
 Strobilanthes procumbens Y.F.Deng & J.R.I.Wood
 Strobilanthes pseudocollina K.J.He & D.H.Qin
 Strobilanthes pteroclada Benoist
 Strobilanthes pterygorrhachis C.B.Clarke
 Strobilanthes pubescens (Bremek.) J.R.I.Wood
 Strobilanthes pubiflora J.R.I.Wood
 Strobilanthes pulcherrima T.Anderson
 Strobilanthes pulneyensis C.B.Clarke
 Strobilanthes punctata Nees
 Strobilanthes pusilla J.R.I.Wood
 Strobilanthes quadrifaria (Wall. ex Nees) Y.F.Deng
 Strobilanthes ramulosa J.R.I.Wood
 Strobilanthes rankanensis Hayata
 Strobilanthes ranongensis Terao
 Strobilanthes recurva C.B.Clarke
 Strobilanthes remota T.Anderson
 Strobilanthes renschiae (Bremek.) J.R.I.Wood & J.R.Benn.
 Strobilanthes repanda (Blume) J.R.Benn.
 Strobilanthes reptans (G.Forst.) Moylan ex Y.F.Deng & J.R.I.Wood
 Strobilanthes reticulata Stapf
 Strobilanthes retusa D.Fang
 Strobilanthes rhamnifolia (Nees) T.Anderson
 Strobilanthes rhombifolia C.B.Clarke
 Strobilanthes rhytiphylla (Nees) Y.F.Deng
 Strobilanthes rhytisperma C.B.Clarke
 Strobilanthes ridleyi Merr.
 Strobilanthes rivularis J.R.I.Wood & J.R.Benn.
 Strobilanthes rosea Nees
 Strobilanthes rostrata Y.F.Deng & J.R.I.Wood
 Strobilanthes rubescens T.Anderson
 Strobilanthes rubicunda (Nees) T.Anderson
 Strobilanthes rufescens (Roth) T.Anderson
 Strobilanthes ruficapillis Ridl.
 Strobilanthes ruficaulis Ridl.
 Strobilanthes rufocapitata C.B.Clarke
 Strobilanthes rufopauper C.B.Clarke
 Strobilanthes rufosepalus C.B.Clarke
 Strobilanthes rufostrobilata C.B.Clarke
 Strobilanthes sabiniana (Wall. ex Lindl.) Nees
 Strobilanthes saccata J.R.I.Wood
 Strobilanthes sainthomiana Augustine, Josekutty & P.Biju
 Strobilanthes saltiensis S.Moore
 Strobilanthes sanjappae Karthik. & Moorthy
 Strobilanthes sarcorrhiza (C.Ling) C.Z.Zheng ex Y.F.Deng & N.H.Xia
 Strobilanthes sarmentosa Benoist
 Strobilanthes scabra Nees
 Strobilanthes scabrida Ridl.
 Strobilanthes schomburgkii (Craib) J.R.I.Wood
 Strobilanthes scrobiculata Dalzell ex C.B.Clarke
 Strobilanthes secunda T.Anderson
 Strobilanthes serrata J.B.Imlay
 Strobilanthes sessilis Nees
 Strobilanthes setosa J.R.I.Wood
 Strobilanthes sexennis Nees
 Strobilanthes shanensis (Bremek.) J.R.I.Wood
 Strobilanthes simonsii T.Anderson
 Strobilanthes simplex J.R.I.Wood
 Strobilanthes sinica (H.S.Lo) Y.F.Deng
 Strobilanthes sinuata J.R.I.Wood
 Strobilanthes speciosa Blume
 Strobilanthes spicata T.Anderson
 Strobilanthes spiciformis Y.F.Deng & J.R.I.Wood
 Strobilanthes squalens S.Moore
 Strobilanthes steenisiana J.R.Benn.
 Strobilanthes stenodon C.B.Clarke
 Strobilanthes stenura (Bremek.) J.R.Benn.
 Strobilanthes stolonifera Benoist
 Strobilanthes straminea W.W.Sm.
 Strobilanthes strigosa D.Fang & H.S.Lo
 Strobilanthes suborbicularis J.B.Imlay
 Strobilanthes sulawesiana J.R.I.Wood
 Strobilanthes sulfurea Benoist
 Strobilanthes sumatrana Miq.
 Strobilanthes sylvestris Ridl.
 Strobilanthes szechuanica (Batalin) J.R.I.Wood & Y.F.Deng
 Strobilanthes tamburensis C.B.Clarke
 Strobilanthes tanakae J.R.I.Wood
 Strobilanthes taoana Y.F.Deng & J.R.I.Wood
 Strobilanthes tenax Dunn
 Strobilanthes tenuiflora J.R.I.Wood
 Strobilanthes teraoi J.R.I.Wood & J.R.Benn.
 Strobilanthes tetrasperma (Champ.) Druce
 Strobilanthes thomsonii T.Anderson
 Strobilanthes thwaitesii T.Anderson
 Strobilanthes tibetica J.R.I.Wood
 Strobilanthes timorensis Nees
 Strobilanthes tomentosa (Nees) J.R.I.Wood
 Strobilanthes tonkinensis Lindau
 Strobilanthes torrentium Benoist
 Strobilanthes trichantha J.R.I.Wood
 Strobilanthes tricostata Sinj.Thomas, B.Mani, Britto & Pradeep
 Strobilanthes tristis (Wight) T.Anderson
 Strobilanthes truncata D.Fang & H.S.Lo
 Strobilanthes tubiflos (C.B.Clarke) J.R.I.Wood
 Strobilanthes twangensis J.R.I.Wood & D.Borah
 Strobilanthes unilateralis J.R.I.Wood
 Strobilanthes urceolaris Gamble
 Strobilanthes urens (Roth) J.R.I.Wood
 Strobilanthes urophylla (Nees) Nees
 Strobilanthes vallicola Y.F.Deng & J.R.I.Wood
 Strobilanthes venosa (C.B.Clarke) J.R.I.Wood
 Strobilanthes verruculosa Nees
 Strobilanthes versicolor Diels
 Strobilanthes vestita Nees
 Strobilanthes violacea Bedd.
 Strobilanthes violascens Ridl.
 Strobilanthes violifolia T.Anderson
 Strobilanthes virendrakumariana Venu & P.Daniel
 Strobilanthes viridis (Merr.) Y.F.Deng
 Strobilanthes viscosa (Arn. ex Nees) T.Anderson
 Strobilanthes wakasana Wakas. & Naruh.
 Strobilanthes walkeri Arn. ex Nees
 Strobilanthes wallichii Nees
 Strobilanthes wangiana Y.F.Deng & J.R.I.Wood
 Strobilanthes warburgii Terao ex J.R.Benn.
 Strobilanthes wardiana J.R.I.Wood
 Strobilanthes wightiana Nees
 Strobilanthes wightii (Bremek.) J.R.I.Wood
 Strobilanthes willisii Carine
 Strobilanthes wilsonii J.R.I.Wood & Y.F.Deng
 Strobilanthes winckelii (Bremek.) J.R.Benn.
 Strobilanthes xanthosticta C.B.Clarke
 Strobilanthes yunnanensis Diels
 Strobilanthes zenkeriana (Nees) T.Anderson
 Strobilanthes zeylanica T.Anderson
 Strobilanthes zwickeyae (Moylan) Y.F.Deng

Herbivory
Strobilanthes species are food plants for the larvae of some Lepidoptera species including Endoclita malabaracus, which has been recorded on S. callosa.

References

eFloras search results: Strobilanthes

External links
 
 

 
Acanthaceae genera
Taxa named by Carl Ludwig Blume
Lamiales of Asia